Mohamed Sid Ali Djouadi (born 13 December 1951) represented Algeria in the 800 m at the 1972 Summer Olympic Games he finished 5th in his heat and failed to advance. He later went on to win gold medals at the 1973 Maghreb Athletics Championships and the 1975 Maghreb Athletics Championships.

References

External links
 

1951 births
Living people
Athletes (track and field) at the 1972 Summer Olympics
Olympic athletes of Algeria
Athletes (track and field) at the 1975 Mediterranean Games
Mediterranean Games silver medalists for Algeria
Algerian male middle-distance runners
African Games bronze medalists for Algeria
African Games medalists in athletics (track and field)
Universiade medalists in athletics (track and field)
Mediterranean Games medalists in athletics
Athletes (track and field) at the 1973 All-Africa Games
Universiade bronze medalists for Algeria
Medalists at the 1975 Summer Universiade
21st-century Algerian people
20th-century Algerian people